Four Corners is a census-designated place (CDP) within the extraterritorial jurisdiction of Houston in Fort Bend County, Texas, United States. The population was 12,103 at the 2020 census, up from 2,954 at the 2000 census.

History
Four Corners began as a community of extended families. By 2011 it had become a rapidly suburbanizing area.

Geography

Four Corners is located near the northeastern border of Fort Bend County at  (29.669366, -95.659147). It is bordered to the north by the Mission Bend CDP and to the east, south, and west by small units of the city of Houston.

The original community was centered on the four-way intersection of Boss Gaston, Old Richmond, and Richmond Gaines roads. The census-designated place as of 2011 includes the crossroads and several new houses west of Texas State Highway 6, north of McKaskle Road, and south of Riverside Grove Drive and Stanbridge Drive. Journalist Jeannie Kever said that the community, once "isolated", had become "something bigger and harder to define, its aging small frame houses and mobile homes engulfed by the omnivorous spoils of growth."

Carmen Martinez, the president of the Fort Bend Freshwater Supply District No. 2 and a Four Corners resident who lived there since 1966, said in a Houston Chronicle article that at one time residents had to go to Houston or Rosenberg to get groceries. As of 2011 residents can go to local area stores to shop.

Demographics

As of the 2020 United States census, there were 12,103 people, 3,012 households, and 2,908 families residing in the CDP.

As of the census of 2000, there were 2,954 people, 775 households, and 702 families residing in the CDP. The population density was 1,038.2 people per square mile (400.2/km2). There were 824 housing units at an average density of 289.6/sq mi (111.6/km2). The racial makeup of the CDP was 42.76% White, 18.96% African American, 0.64% Native American, 15.94% Asian, 0.03% Pacific Islander, 18.82% from other races, and 2.84% from two or more races. Hispanic or Latino of any race were 41.16% of the population.

There were 775 households, out of which 57.4% had children under the age of 18 living with them, 74.3% were married couples living together, 10.2% had a female householder with no husband present, and 9.4% were non-families. 7.2% of all households were made up of individuals, and 2.7% had someone living alone who was 65 years of age or older. The average household size was 3.81 and the average family size was 4.02.

In the CDP, the population was spread out, with 36.7% under the age of 18, 10.0% from 18 to 24, 29.1% from 25 to 44, 19.3% from 45 to 64, and 4.8% who were 65 years of age or older. The median age was 28 years. For every 100 females, there were 100.0 males. For every 100 females age 18 and over, there were 97.8 males.

The median income for a household in the CDP was $63,534, and the median income for a family was $65,200. Males had a median income of $34,821 versus $40,272 for females. The per capita income for the CDP was $19,826. About 12.1% of families and 16.3% of the population were below the poverty line, including 23.4% of those under age 18 and 15.0% of those age 65 or over.

From the 2000 census to the 2010 census, the population increased to 12,382, about four times the population in 2000. As of 2011 90% of the residents are Asian Americans, African-Americans, and Latino Americans. Between the 2000 and 2010 censuses, the number of White Americans increased while the percentage of Whites decreased. Jeannie Kever of the Houston Chronicle said that "not all of the newcomers identify with the old neighborhood and its inhabitants, even those living just a block away."

Karl Eschbach, a former demographer for the state of Texas, said that many people moved from Houston neighborhoods and communities with distinct racial and socioeconomic identities, like the East End, Sunnyside, and the Third Ward, to areas too new to have racial identities. Eschbach explained that "as a large minority middle class started to emerge, Fort Bend was virgin territory that all groups could move to." When explaining why many of the new residents were of minority groups rather than white Americans, Eschbach added, "Many minorities are looking for mixed communities, where whites might feel it's more optimal to live in a subdivision that's more homogeneous with their own group."

Kever said that in previous eras, "Four Corners has always been a multicultural mashup, its residents united by poverty and an appreciation for life in the slow lane." By 2011 many newer residents were wealthier than the original residents.

Government and infrastructure
As of 2011 the original section of Four Corners is serviced by a water system of the Fort Bend Freshwater Supply District No. 2 and individual septic systems. Newer areas have municipal utility districts, which provide sewer and water services.

Originally residents of the original section used individual water wells. Several years prior to 2011, residents of the original section formed the Fort Bend Freshwater Supply District No. 2 and built a water system. Residents still use individual septic systems. According to Carmen Martinez, the president of the supply district, work on a sewer system will start at a later point in 2011.

Education

Four Corners is within the Fort Bend Independent School District.

Elementary schools serving the Four Corners CDP and within the Four Corners CDP include Arizona Fleming Elementary and Mary Austin Holley Elementary. Elementary schools outside of the CDP serving sections of Four Corners include Drabek and Oyster Creek. Hodges Bend Middle School, located in the CDP, serves most of Four Corners, while Garcia Middle School and Sugar Land Middle School, both outside of the CDP, serves a small portion of the area. Austin High School, George Bush High School, and Kempner High School, all outside of the CDP, serve sections of Four Corners.

In previous eras, Four Corners residents attended Travis High School in Pecan Grove, Texas and Dulles High School in Sugar Land.

Parks and recreation
Fort Bend County operates the Four Corners Recreation Center in Four Corners. The park includes a community center, two pavilions, playground equipment, a regulation soccer and softball field, 1/2 mile walking track, and a volleyball court.

References

External links

 

Census-designated places in Fort Bend County, Texas
Census-designated places in Texas